The Cryptocephalini  are a tribe within the leaf beetle subfamily Cryptocephalinae. As the other Cryptocephalinae, they belong to the group of case-bearing leaf beetles known as Camptosomata. Some species are myrmecophilous.

Selected genera
Aporocera Saunders, 1842
Bassareus Haldeman, 1849
Cadmus Erichson, 1842
Cryptocephalus Chapuis, 1875 
Diachus J.L.LeConte, 1880
Griburius Haldeman, 1849
Lexiphanes Gistel, 1836
Pachybrachis Chevrolat, 1836
Triachus J.L.LeConte, 1880

References

External links
 

Cryptocephalinae
Taxa named by Leonard Gyllenhaal